Ponomaryovsky District is an administrative and municipal district (raion), one of the thirty-five in Orenburg Oblast, Russia. It is located in the northwest of the oblast. Its administrative center is the rural locality (a selo) of Ponomaryovka. Population: 15,463 (2010 Census);  The population of Ponomaryovka accounts for 33.6% of the total district's population.

References

Notes

Sources

Districts of Orenburg Oblast